Loeb or Löb may refer to:

People
 Loeb (surname), including a list of people surnamed Loeb or Löb
 Löb Nevakhovich (between 1776 and 1778–1831), Russian writer
 Löb Strauß, birth name of Levi Strauss (1829–1902), German-born American businessman

Businesses
 Loeb (supermarket), a defunct Canadian supermarket chain
 Loeb's (department store), a specialty department store
 Loeb, Rhoades & Co., a Wall Street brokerage firm founded by Carl Loeb and John L. Loeb

Other uses
 Loeb Classical Library, a series of books containing the works of Greek and Latin authors with the original text and the English translation on facing pages
 Frances Lehman Loeb Art Center, an art museum on the campus of Vassar College, in Poughkeepsie, New York, United States

See also 
 Lev (given name)
 Löw (disambiguation)